Eğilmez is a village in the central district (Karaman) of Karaman Province, Turkey. At   it is situated to the north of Karadağ an extinct volcano. The population of the village was 403  as of 2011. The village was founded by Turkmens. The main economic activity of the village is agriculture.

References

Villages in Karaman Central District